Kev can refer to:

Given name
 Kev Adams, French comedian, actor, screenwriter and film producer born Kevin Smadja in 1991
 Kevin Kev Carmody (born 1946), Indigenous Australian singer-songwriter
 Kev Coghlan (born 1988), Scottish Grand Prix motorcycle racer
 Kev Hopper (born 1961), English composer and musician, bass guitarist with the 1980s band Stump
 Kevin Kev Lingard (born 1942), Australian politician
 Kevin Naiqama (born 1989), Australian rugby league footballer
 Kev Orkian (born 1974), British-Armenian musician, comedian and actor
 Kev F. Sutherland (born 1961), Scottish comedian and comic strip creator
 Kevin Kev Walker, British comics artist and illustrator

Other uses
Kiloelectronvolt (keV), a unit of energy
Krefelder Eislauf-Verein 1936 e.V. (KEV), original name of Krefeld Pinguine, a German ice hockey team formed in 1936
 kev, ISO 639-3 code for the Kanikkaran language of southern India
 KEV, IATA airport code for Halli Airport, a military airport in Kuorevesi, Jämsä, Finland
 Kapar Energy Ventures Sdn Bhd (KEV), who operate Sultan Salahuddin Abdul Aziz Power Station
 Key/Encoded-Value (KEV), in the OpenURL standard and others
 Commissariat for Jewish Affairs (KEV), a Bulgarian government agency responsible for the Holocaust in Bulgaria

See also 
 Kevin, a given name occasionally shortened to "Kev"
 Kevin Buzzacott (born 1947), Australian Aboriginal activist often referred to as "Uncle Kev"
 Kevin McQuay (1949–2005), Australian cleaning products entrepreneur nicknamed "Big Kev"

Masculine given names
Hypocorisms